Patrick Gaffney may refer to:

Patrick Gaffney (Buddhist) (born 1949), English Buddhist teacher and editor
Patrick Gaffney (politician) (died 1943), Irish Farmers' Party politician
Patrick Gaffney (anthropologist), American anthropologist and Holy Cross priest